Pseudonemopoda is a genus of flies in the family Sepsidae.

Species
Pseudonemopoda annamensis Ozerov & Krivosheina, 2012
Pseudonemopoda speiseri Duda, 1926

References

Sepsidae
Diptera of Asia
Taxa named by Oswald Duda
Brachycera genera